Secret of the Sultan is a 2010 Turkish action film, directed by Hakan Şahin and written and produced by historian and journalist  Ömer Erbil, starring Emanuel Bettencourt as an American professor in Istanbul to search for the sultan's mysterious chest in the hidden underground cloisters of  Topkapı Palace with the help of his friend Mark Dacascos. It was described by Hürriyet Daily News reviewer Emrah Güler as a mixture of the "National Treasure" movies and Dan Brown's "The Da Vinci Code" and "Angels & Demons"

Plot
An American professor travels to Istanbul to find a mysterious century-old chest built by Sultan Abdülhamid II, which he believes is relevant to the present political power games over oil. His search leads him discover long-forgotten underground cloisters at Topkapı Palace, now the Topkapı Museum, where he confronts a patriotic museum curator and the Turkish intelligence. Conspiracies going back to the Gulf Wars, the Iran-Iraq War, World War I, and as far as the final years of the Ottoman Empire are revealed in the course of his investigation.

Production
The film was shot on location in Istanbul, Turkey, at such historic landmarks as Topkapı Palace, Hagia Sophia, Yıldız Palace and the Istanbul Archaeology Museums.

Release

References

External links
  
 

2010 films
2010s Turkish-language films
2010 action films
Films set in Turkey
Turkish action films